Louis Bancel may refer to:
 Louis Bancel (theologian)
 Louis Bancel (sculptor)